This is a list of all episodes of the television series Kate & Allie.

Series overview

Episodes

Season 1 (1984)

Season 2 (1984–85)

Season 3 (1985–86)

Season 4 (1986–87)

Season 5 (1987–88)

Season 6 (1988–89)

References

External links 

 
 

Kate and Allie